The antpipits, Corythopis, are a genus of South American birds in the tyrant flycatcher family Tyrannidae. These are long legged species that spend most of the time on the ground. 

The genus contains two species:

References

 
Bird genera
Taxa named by Carl Jakob Sundevall
Taxonomy articles created by Polbot